The Vendômois is a traditional area of France equivalent to the arrondissement of Vendôme, to the north of Loir-et-Cher, and on both sides of Loir.

References
Jean-Jacques Loisel, Jean Vassort (ed.), Histoire du Vendômois, Vendôme, Éditions du Cherche-Lune, 2007, 

Geography of Loir-et-Cher